Delta-8-tetrahydrocannabinol (delta-8-THC, Δ8-THC) is a psychoactive cannabinoid found in the Cannabis plant. It is an isomer of delta-9-tetrahydrocannabinol (delta-9-THC, Δ9-THC), the compound commonly known as THC. ∆8-THC is under preliminary research for its biological properties.

Effects 
∆8-THC is moderately less potent than Δ9-THC. This essentially means that it has properties similar to those of ∆9-THC, although to a lesser degree per milligram of material consumed. Delta-8-THC and delta-9-THC both contain a double bond in their molecular chain, but the location is different. Delta-8-THC has the bond in the 8th carbon chain while delta-9 contains it in the 9th carbon chain.

Although ∆8-THC functions similarly to Δ9-THC in many ways, it appears to be only two-thirds as psychoactive. This may be because it binds differently to CB1, the cannabinoid receptor that regulates much of THC’s mind-altering effect. ∆8-THC may cause increased heart rate, reddening of the eyes, dizziness, dryness of the mouth and throat, paresthesia, tinnitus, increased body awareness, weakness, muscle tension or tremor, reduced motor coordination, fatigue, sleepiness, changes in visual perception, altered visual imagery, enhancement of colors or contrasts, time distortion, changes in auditory perception, euphoria, tranquility, relaxation, racing thoughts, dreamy introspective states, or difficulty in thinking, speaking, reading, or remembering.

A 1973 study testing the effects of ∆8-THC in dogs and monkeys reported that a single oral dose of 9,000 milligrams per kilogram of body mass (mg/kg) was nonlethal in all dogs and monkeys studied. The same study reported that the median lethal dose of ∆8-THC in rats was comparable to that of ∆9-THC. Both isomers of THC have been found to cause a transient increase in blood pressure in rats, though the effects of cannabinoids on the cardiovascular system are complex. Animal studies indicate that ∆8-THC exerts many of its central effects by binding to cannabinoid receptors found in various regions of the brain, including the cerebral cortex, thalamus, basal ganglia, hippocampus, and cerebellum.

A 2021 survey of 521 people who use delta-8-THC found that the most common self-reported effects were relaxation (71%), euphoria (68%), pain relief (55%), difficulty concentrating (81%), difficulties with short-term memory (80%), and altered sense of time (74%).

Pharmacology

Pharmacodynamics 
The pharmacodynamic profile of ∆8-THC is similar to that of ∆9-THC. It is a partial agonist of CB1 and CB2 cannabinoid receptors with about half the potency of ∆9-THC in most but not all measures of biological activity. ∆8-THC has been reported to have a Ki value of 44 ± 12 nM at the CB1 receptor and 44 ± 17 nM at the CB2 receptor. These values are higher than those typically reported for ∆9-THC (CB1 Ki = 40.7 nM) at the same receptors, indicating that ∆8-THC binds to cannabinoid receptors less efficiently than ∆9-THC.

Pharmacokinetics 
The pharmacokinetic profile of ∆8-THC is also similar to that of ∆9-THC. Following ingestion in humans, hepatic cytochrome P450 enzymes including CYP2C9 and CYP3A4 first convert ∆8-THC into 11-hydroxy-Δ8-tetrahydrocannabinol (11-OH-Δ8-THC). Next, dehydrogenase enzymes convert 11-OH-Δ8-THC into 11-nor-Δ8-tetrahydrocannabinol-9-carboxylic acid (11-nor-Δ8-THC-9-COOH, also known as Δ8-THC-11-oic acid). Finally, Δ8-THC-11-oic acid undergoes glucuronidation by glucuronidase enzymes to form 11-nor-Δ8-tetrahydrocannabinol-9-carboxylic acid glucuronide (Δ8-THC-COOH-glu). This final product is then excreted in the urine.

Physical and chemical properties 
∆8-THC is a tricyclic terpenoid. Although it has the same chemical formula as ∆9-THC, one of its carbon-carbon double bonds is located in a different position. This difference in structure increases the chemical stability of ∆8-THC relative to ∆9-THC, lengthening shelf life and allowing the compound to resist undergoing oxidation to cannabinol over time. Like other cannabinoids, ∆8-THC is very lipophilic (log P = 7.4). It is an extremely viscous, colorless oil at room temperature.

While ∆8-THC is naturally found in plants of the Cannabis genus, this compound can also be produced in an industrial or laboratory setting by exposing CBD to acids and heat. Solvents that may be used during this process include methylene chloride, toluene, and hexane. Acids that may be used include tosylic acid, indium(III) triflate, trimethylsilyl trifluoromethanesulfonate, hydrochloric acid, and sulfuric acid. Because it is possible for chemical contaminants to be generated during the process of converting CBD to ∆8-THC, such as Δ10-THC, 9-OH-HHC and other side products, as well as the potentially toxic chemical reagents used during manufacture, concern has been raised about the safety of untested or impure ∆8-THC products.

 

∆8-THC has a double bond (a) between the carbon atoms labeled 8 and 9. ∆9-THC has a double bond (a) between the carbon atoms labeled 9 and 10.

The ongoing controversy regarding the legal status of ∆8-THC in the U.S.  is complicated by chemical nomenclature. According to a 2019 literature review published in Clinical Toxicology, the term "synthetic cannabinoid" typically refers to a full agonist of CB1 and CB2 cannabinoid receptors. According to the review, "The psychoactive (and probably the toxic) effects of synthetic cannabinoid receptor agonists are likely due to their action as full receptor agonists and their greater potency at CB1 receptors." Because ∆8-THC and ∆9-THC are partial agonists of cannabinoid receptors, rather than full agonists, these compounds are less potent and less toxic than many synthetic cannabinoids. Although it has not been definitively proven if full agonism is the reason for toxicity as ∆9-THC has been shown to act as a full CB1 agonist on specific CB1 receptors located in the hippocampus section of the brain. and the synthetic cannabinoid EG-018 acts as a partial agonist The classical cannabinoid dibenzopyran structure class of drugs which includes THC interact with a different spot inside of the CB1 receptor than synthetic cannabinoid compounds of unrelated chemical classes such as Naphthoylindoles do which may contribute to toxicity.

History 
The partial synthesis of ∆8-THC was published in 1941 by Roger Adams and colleagues at the University of Illinois. In 1942, the same research group studied its physiological and psychoactive effects after oral dosing in human volunteers. Total syntheses of ∆8-THC were achieved by 1965. In 1966, the chemical structure of ∆8-THC isolated from cannabis was characterized using modern methods by Richard L. Hively, William A. Mosher, and Friedrich W. Hoffmann at the University of Delaware. A stereospecific synthesis of ∆8-THC from olivetol and verbenol was reported by Raphael Mechoulam and colleagues at the Weizmann Institute of Science in 1967. ∆8-THC was often referred to as "Delta-6-THC" (Δ6-THC) in early scientific literature, but this name is no longer conventional among most authors.

Legality in the United States 
In 1937, ∆9-THC was effectively made illegal with the passage of the Marihuana Tax Act, which made cannabis illegal on the federal level. Over the course of the 1970s, 11 states decriminalized marijuana, with others reducing related penalties. President Ronald Reagan re-enacted mandatory sentences for cannabis-related offenses.

The 2018 United States farm bill signed into law in December 2018 states that, "The term “hemp” means the plant Cannabis sativa L. and any part of that plant, including the seeds thereof and all derivatives, extracts, cannabinoids, isomers, acids, salts, and salts of isomers, whether growing or not, with a delta-9 tetrahydrocannabinol concentration of not more than 0.3 percent on a dry weight basis.", ∆8-THC products partially synthesized from compliant sources (including industrial hemp and derivative cannabidiol extracts) have been sold by a range of digital and brick and mortar retailers, including head shops and gas stations. Common products range from bulk quantities of unrefined distillate to prepared edibles and atomizer cartridges infused with cannabis-derived terpenes. They are usually marketed as federally legal alternatives to their ∆9-THC counterparts. However, the legal status of ∆8-THC at the federal level is in question with some believing that the Oct. 2020 DEA IFR addressing "synthetics" applied to Delta-8 and other hemp derivatives allowed by the Farm Bill. While most states have not arrested significant numbers of people for ∆8-THC, a handful have been arrested and charged, leading to confusion as to its legal status in those states.

Despite claims of legality by manufacturers, independent testing of products from retail often reveals significant levels of ∆9-THC, well above the legal threshold. One store owner in Menomonee Falls, Wisconsin is facing a sentence of up to 50 years for selling delta 8 products with illegal amounts of ∆9-THC. Other raids and arrests have happened due to delta 9 THC content of these products in North Carolina. Catoosa County Sheriff Sisk has announced intent to prosecute stores distributing delta 8 THC with non-compliant ∆9-THC levels, and has stated “the products the sheriffs office has purchased and tested all contain significant levels of ∆9.” and that they have “evidence needed to move forward with prosecution and seizures." There are also issues related to incidental manufacture of delta-8 THC, as delta 9 is produced as an intermediate product in the process of acid catalyzed ring closure of cannabidiol.

∆8-THC products have been sold in regulated recreational cannabis and medical cannabis industries within the United States for over 2 years.

∆8-THC has not been evaluated or approved by the FDA.

Side effects and safety
∆8-THC is typically synthesized from cannabidiol extracted from hemp as the natural quantities of ∆8-THC found in hemp are low. The reaction often yields a mixture that contains other cannabinoids and unknown reaction by-products. As a result, most products sold as ∆8-THC are not actually pure ∆8-THC. Little is known about the identity and the health effects of the impurities.

The safety profile of regular, long-term delta-8-THC use is unknown. There have been at least 104 adverse event reports made regarding ∆8-THC, and at least 2 deaths associated with ∆8-THC products. National poison control centers received 2,362 exposure cases of delta-8 THC products between January 1, 2021 (i.e., date that delta-8 THC product code was added to database), and February 28, 2022. 58% of these exposures involve adults.

When using ∆8-THC, side effects may occur, such as dry mouth (colloquially known as "cottonmouth"), fatigue, and bloodshot eyes. ∆8-THC may be used as disposable vapes, edibles, or atomizer cartridges. People who consume ∆8-THC edibles are more likely to experience severe side effects compared to other methods of ingesting.

Research 
∆8-THC has been studied as a potential treatment for glaucoma, corneal injury, and chemotherapy-induced nausea and vomiting. Although it is a minor constituent of medical cannabis, no large clinical studies have been conducted on delta-8-THC alone as of 2022.

See also 

 Ajulemic acid
 Cannabinoid
 Cannabis (drug)
 delta-3-Tetrahydrocannabinol
 delta-4-Tetrahydrocannabinol
 delta-7-Tetrahydrocannabinol (delta-5-tetrahydrocannabinol)
 delta-10-Tetrahydrocannabinol (delta-2-tetrahydrocannabinol)
 delta-6-Cannabidiol
 11-Hydroxy-Delta-8-THC
 Endocannabinoid system
 Hexahydrocannabinol
 7,8-Dihydrocannabinol
 Tetrahydrocannabinol
 Tetrahydrocannabutol
 Tetrahydrocannabiphorol
 THC-O-acetate
 THC-O-phosphate

References

External links 
 CDC ALERT (September 14, 2021)
 FDA ALERT (May 4, 2022)
 Delta 8 Products There are many factors that affect the value of an option.

Benzochromenes
Phytocannabinoids
Heterocyclic compounds with 3 rings
Oxygen heterocycles